Tucson is a 1949 American drama film directed by William F. Claxton, written by Arnold Belgard and starring Jimmy Lydon, Penny Edwards, Deanna Wayne, Charles Russell, Joe Sawyer and Walter Sande. It was released on April 27, 1949 by 20th Century-Fox.

Plot
Carefree University of Arizona student Andy Bryant's preoccupation with training his American Quarter Horse for an upcoming intercollegiate rodeo nearly results in tragedy for his best friend. Shaken by the event, Andy vows to focus on his studies and make amends.

Cast    
Jimmy Lydon as Andy Bryant
Penny Edwards as Laurie Sherman
Deanna Wayne as Jennifer Johnson
Charles Russell as Gregg Johnson
Joe Sawyer as Tod Bryant
Walter Sande as George Reeves
Lyn Wilde as Gertie Peck
Marcia Mae Jones as Polly Johnson
John Ridgely as Ben
Grandon Rhodes as Dean Sherman
Gil Stratton as Jerry Twill
Harry Lauter as George Reeves Jr.
The Cass County Boys as Musical Ensemble

References

External links
 

1949 films
American drama films
1949 drama films
20th Century Fox films
American black-and-white films
Films directed by William F. Claxton
1940s English-language films
1940s American films